Fairfield Township is one of the twenty-two townships of Tuscarawas County, Ohio, United States.  The 2000 census found 1,487 people in the township.

Geography
Located in the northeastern part of the county, it borders the following townships:
Sandy Township - north
Warren Township - east
Goshen Township - south
Dover Township - west
Lawrence Township - northwest

No municipalities are located in Fairfield Township, although the unincorporated community of Somerdale lies in the northeastern part of the township.

Name and history
It is one of seven Fairfield Townships statewide.

Government
The township is governed by a three-member board of trustees, who are elected in November of odd-numbered years to a four-year term beginning on the following January 1. Two are elected in the year after the presidential election and one is elected in the year before it. There is also an elected township fiscal officer, who serves a four-year term beginning on April 1 of the year after the election, which is held in November of the year before the presidential election. Vacancies in the fiscal officership or on the board of trustees are filled by the remaining trustees.  The current trustees are William Beans, Kenneth Brown, and John Dunn, and the fiscal officer is Jennifer Brown.

References

External links
County website

Townships in Tuscarawas County, Ohio
Townships in Ohio